Phrynocephalus lutensis, the Lut Desert toad-headed agama,  is a species of agamid lizard found in Iran.

References

lutensis
Reptiles described in 2015
Taxa named by Steven C. Anderson